Steljano Velo (born 20 March 1996) is an Albanian professional footballer who most recently played as a defender for Albanian club KF Apolonia Fier.

External links

Steljano Velo profile FSHF.org

1996 births
Living people
Greek people of Albanian descent
Association football defenders
Albanian footballers
Albania youth international footballers
Flamurtari Vlorë players
U.S. Vibonese Calcio players
FK Dainava Alytus players
KF Vlora players
FC Kamza players
KF Oriku players
KF Apolonia Fier players
Serie D players
Kategoria e Parë players
Kategoria e Dytë players
Albanian expatriate footballers
Expatriate footballers in Lithuania
Albanian expatriate sportspeople in Lithuania
Expatriate footballers in Italy
Albanian expatriate sportspeople in Italy
Footballers from Alexandreia, Greece